The Los Reyunos Dam is an embankment dam on the Diamante River, in central Mendoza Province, Argentina, some twenty-two miles (thirty-five kilometers) from the city of San Rafael.

The dam is used to generate hydroelectricity. This is done with a pumped-storage power station located below the level of the reservoir. About one mile (two kilometer) downstream is a smaller, compensation dam, which forms the lower reservoir, called El Tigre. During the hours of decreased power demand, water is pumped from the reservoir of El Tigre back into Los Reyunos to stabilize the water level.

The reservoir is employed in raising Salmonidae and silverside, allowing for sport fishing. Los Reyunos Fishing and Nautical Club, along with private summer residences and a hotel, lies on the western shore of the reservoir and serves as a base for activities in the lake (such as windsurf, canoeing) and in the surrounding mountains (such as hiking).

References

  Los Reyunos at ValleGrande.com.ar.

Dams in Argentina
Dams completed in 1983
Hydroelectric power stations in Argentina
Buildings and structures in Mendoza Province
Pumped-storage hydroelectric power stations in Argentina
Energy infrastructure completed in 1983
1983 establishments in Argentina